Uniworld Boutique River Cruise Collection is located in Los Angeles, California and the company operates a fleet of 21 river cruising cruise ships along the rivers of Europe, Russia, Egypt, South America, and China. Uniworld also has operational offices located in the Netherlands, Switzerland, France, and China. The company is part of The Travel Corporation group, which also includes businesses such as Trafalgar Tours and Contiki Tours.

History
Uniworld Boutique River Cruise Collection, established in 1976, is a luxury river cruise company based in Los Angeles, California.  Uniworld currently operates more than 500 river cruises annually with itineraries in more than 20 countries. Its cruises range in length from a week to a month. Along with its primary operations in Western and Central Europe, the company also works in partnerships with affiliated groups in Portugal, Russia, Egypt and China.

Fleet

Uniworld is a member of Cruise Lines International Association.

MSC Opera collision

On 2 June 2019, the River Countess, moored at the San Basilio Cruise Pier in the Giudecca Canal, in Venice, Italy was struck by MSC Opera. Four people were slightly injured. River Countess suffered freeboard bow and stern damage. On 4 June, Uniworld programmed necessary repairs, planning a return to service for 21 July. On 17 June, River Countess was towed from the S. Basilio Terminal to the nearby port of Marghera, where she was placed over a semi-submersible heavy-lift ship, and thereby moved to a shipyard in Trieste for full repair. On 20 June, River Countess was at Trieste shipyard, transported there by the Heavy Load Carrier Yacht Express. After thorough inspection of the damage at the Trieste shipyard, it was determined that it was more extensive than originally thought and would take longer to be repaired. On 26 June, the return to service was postponed to 6 September (with the cruise starting on 8 September). River Countess returned to service, in the Venice area, on Sunday 8 September 2019.

References

External links

Cruise lines
River cruise companies
Shipping companies of the United States
Companies based in Los Angeles
American companies established in 1976
Transport companies established in 1976
Privately held companies based in California